Boloria improba, the dingy fritillary, is a butterfly of the family Nymphalidae. In Europe it is only found in small parts of Scandinavia, more specifically the border region between Norway, Sweden and Finland. The species is also present in North America in the northeastern part of Alaska and some isolated populations in the Canadian part of the Rocky Mountains, southwestern Wyoming and southwestern Colorado. In Russia it is present in the northeast (the Chukotka region).

The wingspan is 28–34 mm. Seitz improba Btlr., one of the Lepidoptera which go farthest north, from Nova Semblia, is smaller and above darker [ than frigga]; on the hindwing beneath the median band is somewhat less bright yellow and the rhomb before the middle of the costa is vivid bluish white. It is found in alpine or tundra habitats. 

The larvae probably feed on Polygonum viviparum in Europe. In North America the food plants are Salix arctica and Salix reticulata nivalis.

Subspecies 
The following subspecies are recognized:
B. i. acrocnema in the San Juan Mountains in southwestern Colorado
B. i. harryi in the Wind River Mountains in southwestern Wyoming
B. i. improba in Alaska and northwestern Canada. The Siberian variant which is more yellow are considered the same subspecies, they are called form youngi.
B. i. improbula northern Scandinavia

References

External links
Butterflies and Moths of North America
Butterflies of Canada
Butterflies of Norway
Butterflies of Europe

Boloria
Butterflies of Europe
Butterflies of Asia
Butterflies of North America
Butterflies described in 1877